The Business of the Supreme Court: A Study in the Federal Judicial System (1928) is a book written by Felix Frankfurter (future U.S. Supreme Court justice) and his former student James McCauley Landis.

Bibliography 
The book was a collection of the following articles from the Harvard Law Review:
Felix Frankfurter & James M. Landis, The Business of the Supreme Court of the United States—A Study in the Federal Judicial System, 38  1005 (1925).
Felix Frankfurter, The Business of the Supreme Court of the United States—A Study in the Federal Judicial System, 39  35 (1925).
Felix Frankfurter, The Business of the Supreme Court of the United States—A Study in the Federal Judicial System, 39  325 (1926).
Felix Frankfurter, The Business of the Supreme Court of the United States—A Study in the Federal Judicial System, 39  587 (1926).
Felix Frankfurter, The Business of the Supreme Court of the United States—A Study in the Federal Judicial System, 39  1046 (1926).

References 

Law books